The Italian colonial empire, whose East African territories were known between 1936 and 1941 as The Empire (L'Impero), began in Africa in the 19th century and comprised the colonies, protectorates, concessions and dependencies of the Kingdom of Italy. In Africa, the colonial empire included the territories of present-day Libya, Eritrea, Somalia and Ethiopia (the last three being officially named "Africa Orientale Italiana", AOI); outside Africa, Italy possessed the Dodecanese Islands (following the Italo-Turkish War), Albania (a protectorate from 1917 to 1920 and from 1939, when it was invaded and forced into a personal union with Italy, to 1943), and had a concession in China.

The Fascist government that came to power with dictator Benito Mussolini after 1922 sought to increase the size of the Italian empire and to satisfy the claims of Italian irredentists. Systematic "demographic colonization" was encouraged by the government, and by 1939, Italian settlers numbered 120,000—150,000 in Italian Libya and 165,000 in Italian East Africa.

During World War II, Italy allied with Germany in 1940 and occupied British Somaliland, western Egypt, much of Yugoslavia, Tunisia, parts of south-western France and most of Greece; however, it then lost those conquests and its African colonies to the invading allied forces by 1943. In 1947, Italy officially relinquished claims on its former colonies. Only the territory of Somalia was eventually turned into a UN trust territory under Italian administration until 1960. Following the independence of Somalia in 1960, Italy's 65-year period of imperialism concluded.

History

Background and pre-unification era

Imperialism in Italy dates back to ancient Rome, and the Latin notion of mare nostrum ("Our Sea", referring to the Mediterranean) has historically been the basis for Italian imperialism, especially during the fascist era. During the Middle Ages and the modern period, the Republic of Venice and the Republic of Genoa controlled networks of "colonies" in the Mediterranean region known as the Venetian Empire and the Genoese Empire respectively. Between the 15th and 16th centuries, Italian explorers contributed to the colonial enterprises of other European countries in the Americas: Cristopher Columbus from Genoa served Spain, Amerigo Vespucci from Florence served Portugal, the Cabot brothers from Venice served England, and Giovanni da Verrazzano from Florence served France.  However, no Italian power took an active role in the scramble for the Americas, with the notable exception of the Pope who acted as an arbiter between European colonial powers during the Renaissance. The geographical position of Italy, located in the center of an internal sea, without an open free access to the ocean, contributed to this purely Mediterranean policy. Ferdinand I, Grand Duke of Tuscany, made the only Italian attempt to create a colony in the Americas, in what is now French Guiana, organizing in 1608 an expedition to explore the north of Brazil and the Amazon river in 1608 under the command of the English captain Robert Thornton. However, Thornton, on his return from the preparatory expedition in 1609, found Ferdinand I dead and his successor, Cosimo II, was not interested in the project. In 1651, Giovanni Paolo Lascaris, Italian nobleman and Grand Master of the Knights Hospitaller of Malta (at the time a vassal state of the Kingdom of Sicily), possessed four Caribbean islands: Saint Christopher, Saint Martin, Saint Barthélemy, and Saint Croix, which were colonized from 1651 until 1665. No other colonial attempt in the ocean was made and, by 1797, the Venetian and Genoese possessions in the Mediterranean were lost.

Scramble for an empire

Once unified as a nation-state in the late 19th century, Italy intended to compete with the other European powers for the new age of European colonial expansion. It saw its interests in the Mediterranean and in the Horn of Africa, a region yet to be colonized and with access to the ocean. Italy had arrived late to the colonial race and its status as the least of the Great Powers, a position of relative weakness in international affairs, meant that it was dependent on the acquiescence of Britain, France and Germany towards its empire-building. Italy had long considered the Ottoman province of Tunisia, where a large community of Tunisian Italians lived, within its economic sphere of influence. It did not consider annexing it until 1879, when it became apparent that Britain and Germany were encouraging France to add it to its colonial holdings in North Africa. A last-minute offer by Italy to share Tunisia between the two countries was refused, and France, confident in German support, ordered its troops in from French Algeria, imposing a protectorate over Tunisia in May 1881 under the Treaty of Bardo. The shock of the "Slap of Tunis", as it was referred to in the Italian press, and the sense of Italy's isolation in Europe, led it into signing the Triple Alliance in 1882 with Germany and Austria-Hungary.

The genesis of the Italian colonial empire was the purchase in 1869 of Assab Bay on the Red Sea by an Italian navigation company which intended to establish a coaling station at the time the Suez Canal was being opened to navigation. This was taken over by the Italian government in 1882, becoming modern Italy's first overseas territory.

Italy's search for colonies continued until February 1886, when, by secret agreement with Britain, it annexed the port of Massawa in Eritrea on the Red Sea from the crumbling Egyptian Empire. Italian annexation of Massawa denied the Ethiopian Empire of Yohannes IV an outlet to the sea. At the same time, Italy occupied territory on the south side of the horn of Africa, forming what would become Italian Somaliland. However, Italy coveted Ethiopia itself and, in 1887, Italian Prime Minister Agostino Depretis ordered an invasion, leading to the Eritrea War. This invasion was halted after the loss of five hundred Italian troops at the Battle of Dogali. Depretis's successor, Prime Minister Francesco Crispi signed the Treaty of Wuchale in 1889 with Menelik II, the new emperor. This treaty ceded Ethiopian territory around Massawa to Italy to form the colony of Italian Eritrea, and – at least, according to the Italian version of the treaty – made Ethiopia an Italian protectorate. Relations between Italy and Menelik deteriorated over the next few years until the First Italo-Ethiopian War broke out in 1895, when Crispi ordered Italian troops into the country. Vastly outnumbered and poorly equipped, the result was a decisive defeat for Italy at the hands of Ethiopian forces at the Battle of Adwa in 1896. The Ethiopians were supported by Russian advisers and equipment, as well as by a unit of Russian volunteers. The death toll was 6,889, including 4,133 Italians. The Ethiopians counted at least 4,000 dead and 10,000 wounded. Total Italian, Eritrean, and Somali deaths, including those from disease, were estimated at 9,000.

Italy also fought in the Mahdist War, and since 1890 it defeated Mahdist troops in the Battle of Serobeti and the First Battle of Agordat. In December 1893, Italian colonial troops and Mahdists fought again in the Second Battle of Agordat; Ahmed Ali campaigned against the Italian forces in eastern Sudan and led about 10–12,000 men east from Kassala, encountering 2,400 Italians and their Eritrean Ascaris commanded by Colonel Arimondi. The Italians won again, and the outcome of the battle constituted "the first decisive victory yet won by Europeans against the Sudanese revolutionaries". A year later, Italian colonial forces seized Kassala after the successful Battle of Kassala; Italy returned the city to the British at the end of the war three years later.

In 1898, in the wake of the acquisition of leased territories by Germany, Russia, Britain and France in China earlier that year, the Italian government, as a matter of national prestige and to assert Italy's great power status, demanded the cession of Sanmen Bay to serve as a coaling station. Aware that Italy did not have sufficient naval power in Asian waters to back up its demand, the Chinese imperial government rejected the ultimatum and all subsequent requests, arguing that Italy had no real political or economic interests in China. This national humiliation, which for Italy's main newspaper made the country appear "like a third or fourth-rate power", provoked the fall of the Italian government. This prompted Italy to take part in the international expedition in Beijing at the outbreak of the Boxer Rebellion the following year, and resulted in the acquisition of an concession in Tianjin in 1901, its only outpost in Asia. The concession was administered by the Italian consul in Tianjin.

A wave of nationalism that swept Italy at the turn of the 20th century led to the founding of the Italian Nationalist Association, which pressed for the expansion of Italy's empire. Newspapers were filled with talk of revenge for the humiliations suffered in Ethiopia at the end of the previous century, and of nostalgia for the Roman era. Libya, it was suggested, as an ex-Roman colony, should be "taken back" to provide a solution to the problems of Southern Italy's population growth. Fearful of being excluded altogether from North Africa by Britain and France, and mindful of public opinion, Prime Minister Giovanni Giolitti ordered the declaration of war on the Ottoman Empire, of which Libya was part, in October 1911. As a result of the Italo-Turkish War, Italy gained Libya and the Dodecanese Islands. A distinguishing feature of this desert war in Libya in 1912 was the first use of an armoured  fighting vehicle in military history. The war also featured the first significant employment of air power in warfare. Nine Italian aircraft flew both combat and support missions during the campaign. History's first war death of a pilot occurred when an aircraft crashed during a recon sortie.

World War I and aftermath

In 1914 Italy remained neutral and did not join its ally Germany in World War I. The Allies made promises and in 1915 Italy joined them. It was promised territorial spoils mainly from Austria and Turkey.

Prior to direct intervention in World War I, Italy occupied the Albanian port of Vlorë in December 1914. In the fall of 1916, Italy started to occupy southern Albania. In 1916, Italian forces recruited Albanian irregulars to serve alongside them. Italy, with permission of the Allied command, occupied Northern Epirus on 23 August 1916, forcing the neutralist Greek Army to withdraw its occupation forces from there. In June 1917, Italy proclaimed central and southern Albania as a protectorate of Italy while Northern Albania was allocated to the states of Serbia and Montenegro. By 31 October 1918, French and Italian forces expelled the Austro-Hungarian Army from Albania. However, in 1920, an Albanian rebellion led the Italians to agree to return the occupied regions to Albania, with the exception of Sazan Island.

Dalmatia was a strategic region during World War I that both Italy and Serbia intended to seize from Austria-Hungary. The Treaty of London guaranteed Italy the right to annex a large portion of Dalmatia in exchange for Italy's participation on the Allied side. From 5–6 November 1918, Italian forces were reported to have reached Lissa, Lagosta, Sebenico, and other localities on the Dalmatian coast. By the end of hostilities in November 1918, the Italian military had seized control of the entire portion of Dalmatia that had been guaranteed to Italy by the Treaty of London and by 17 November had seized Fiume as well. In 1918, Admiral Enrico Millo declared himself Italy's Governor of Dalmatia. Famous Italian nationalist Gabriele D'Annunzio supported the seizure of Dalmatia, and proceeded to Zara (today's Zadar) in an Italian warship in December 1918.

At the concluding Treaty of Versailles in 1919, Italy received less in Europe than had been promised and none overseas mandate except for a promise of colonial compensations made on 7 May 1919 during the partition of Germany's colonies between France and Britain. To satisfy this promise, France and Britain directly or indirectly gave Italy, from 1919 to 1935, a number of territories to expand Libya (Cufra, Sarra, Giarabub, the Aouzou strip, other lands in the Sahara), Somalia (Jubaland), the Dodecanese (Kastellorizo), and Eritrea (Raheita, the Hanish islands). In April 1920, it was agreed between the British and Italian foreign ministers that Jubaland would be Italy's first compensation from Britain, but London held back on the deal for several years, aiming to use it as leverage to force Italy to cede the Dodecanese to Greece.

Fascism and the Italian Empire

In 1922, the leader of the Italian fascist movement, Benito Mussolini, became Prime Minister and dictator. Mussolini resolved the question of sovereignty over the Dodecanese at the 1923 Treaty of Lausanne, which formalized Italian administration of both Libya and the Dodecanese Islands, in return for a payment to Turkey, the successor state to the Ottoman Empire, though he failed in an attempt to extract a mandate of a portion of Iraq from Britain.

The month following the ratification of the Lausanne treaty, Mussolini ordered the invasion of the Greek island of Corfu after the Corfu incident. The Italian press supported the move, noting that Corfu had been a Venetian possession for four hundred years. The matter was taken by Greece to the League of Nations, where Mussolini was convinced by Britain to evacuate Italian troops, in return for reparations from Greece. The confrontation led Britain and Italy to resolve the question of Jubaland in 1924, which was merged into Italian Somaliland.

During the late 1920s, imperial expansion became an increasingly favoured theme in Mussolini's speeches. Amongst Mussolini's aims were that Italy had to become the dominant power in the Mediterranean that would be able to challenge France or Britain, as well as attain access to the Atlantic and Indian Oceans. Mussolini alleged that Italy required uncontested access to the world's oceans and shipping lanes to ensure its national sovereignty. This was elaborated on in a document he later drew up in 1939 called "The March to the Oceans", and included in the official records of a meeting of the Grand Council of Fascism. This text asserted that maritime position determined a nation's independence: countries with free access to the high seas were independent; while those who lacked this, were not. Italy, which only had access to an inland sea without French and British acquiescence, was only a "semi-independent nation", and alleged to be a "prisoner in the Mediterranean":

In the Balkans, the Fascist regime claimed Dalmatia and held ambitions over Albania, Slovenia, Croatia, Bosnia and Herzegovina, Vardar Macedonia, and Greece based on the precedent of previous Roman dominance in these regions. Dalmatia and Slovenia were to be directly annexed into Italy while the remainder of the Balkans was to be transformed into Italian client states. The regime also sought to establish protective patron-client relationships with Austria, Hungary, Yugoslavia, Romania, and Bulgaria.

In both 1932 and 1935, Italy demanded a League of Nations mandate of the former German Cameroon and a free hand in Ethiopia from France in return for Italian support against Germany (see Stresa Front). This was refused by French Prime Minister Édouard Herriot, who was not yet sufficiently worried about the prospect of a German resurgence. 

In its second invasion of Ethiopia in 1935–36, Italy was successful and it merged its new conquest with its older east African colonies to create Italian East Africa. On 9 May 1936 Mussolini proclaimed the establishment of the Italian Empire in East Africa ("l'Impero"), with King Victor Emmanuel III as Emperor of Ethiopia. In 1939, Italy invaded Albania and incorporated it into the Fascist state. During the Second World War (1939–1945), Italy occupied British Somaliland, parts of south-eastern France, western Egypt and most of Greece, but then lost those conquests and its African colonies, including Ethiopia, to the invading allied forces by 1943. It was forced in the peace treaty of 1947 to relinquish sovereignty over all its colonies. It was granted a trust to administer former Italian Somaliland under United Nations supervision in 1950. When Somalia became independent in 1960, Italy's eight-decade experiment with colonialism had ended.

The Second Italo-Ethiopian War cost 4,359 killed in action—2,313 Italians, 1,086 Eritreans, 507 Somalis and Libyans, and 453 Italian laborers. Ethiopian military and civilian dead, many of them from Italian bomb and mustard gas attacks, were estimated as high as 275,000.

In July 1936, Francisco Franco of the Nationalist faction in the Spanish Civil War requested Italian support against the ruling Republican faction, and guaranteed that, if Italy supported the Nationalists, "future relations would be more than friendly" and that Italian support "would have permitted the influence of Rome to prevail over that of Berlin in the future politics of Spain". Italy intervened in the civil war with the intention of occupying the Balearic Islands and creating a client state in Spain. Italy sought the control of the Balearic Islands due to its strategic position – Italy could use the islands as a base to disrupt the lines of communication between France and its North African colonies and between British Gibraltar and Malta. After the victory by Franco and the Nationalists in the war, Italy pressured Franco to permit an Italian occupation of the Balearic Islands but he did not do so.

After the United Kingdom signed the Anglo-Italian Easter Accords in 1938, Mussolini and foreign minister Ciano issued demands for concessions in the Mediterranean by France, particularly regarding Djibouti, Tunisia and the French-run Suez Canal. Three weeks later, Mussolini told Ciano that he intended for Italy to demand an Italian takeover of Albania. Mussolini professed that Italy would only be able to "breathe easily" if it had acquired a contiguous colonial domain in Africa from the Atlantic to the Indian Oceans, and when ten million Italians had settled in them. In 1938, Italy demanded a sphere of influence in the Suez Canal in Egypt, specifically demanding that the French-dominated Suez Canal Company accept an Italian representative on its board of directors. Italy opposed the French monopoly over the Suez Canal because, under the French-dominated Suez Canal Company, all Italian merchant traffic to its colony of Italian East Africa was forced to pay tolls on entering the canal.

In 1939, Italy invaded and captured Albania and made it a part of the Italian Empire as a protectorate and separate kingdom in personal union with the Italian crown. The region of modern-day Albania had been an early part of the Roman Empire, which had actually been held before northern parts of Italy had been taken by the Romans, but had long since been populated by Albanians, even though Italy had retained strong links with the Albanian leadership and considered it firmly within its sphere of influence. It is possible that Mussolini simply wanted a spectacular success over a smaller neighbour to match Germany's absorption of Austria and Czechoslovakia. Italian King Victor Emmanuel III took the Albanian crown, and a fascist government under Shefqet Verlaci was established to rule over Albania.

World War II

Mussolini entered World War II in June 1940 on the side of Adolf Hitler with plans to enlarge Italy's territorial holdings. He had designs on an area of western Yugoslavia, southern France, Corsica, Malta, Tunisia, part of Algeria, an Atlantic port in Morocco, French Somaliland and British-controlled Egypt and Sudan. 

On 10 June 1940, Mussolini declared war on Britain and France; both countries had been at war with Nazi Germany since September of the previous year. In July 1940, Italian foreign minister Count Ciano presented Hitler with a list of Italy's goals that included: the annexation of Corsica, Nice, and Malta; protectorate in Tunisia and a buffer zone in Eastern Algeria; independence with Italian military presence and bases in Lebanon, Palestine, Syria, and Transjordan as well as expropriation of oil companies in those territories; military occupation of Aden, Perim and Sokotra; Cyprus given to Greece in exchange for Ionian islands and Ciamuria given to Italy; Italy is given British Somaliland, Djibuti, French Equatorial Africa up to Ubangi-Shari, as well as Ciano adding at the meeting that Italy wanted Kenya and Uganda as well. Hitler made no promises.

In October 1940, Mussolini ordered the invasion of Greece from Albania, but the operation was unsuccessful. In April 1941, Germany launched an invasion of Yugoslavia and then attacked Greece. Italy and other German allies supported both actions. The German and Italian armies overran Yugoslavia in about two weeks and, despite British support in Greece, the Axis troops overran that country by the end of April. The Italians gained control over portions of both occupied Yugoslavia and occupied Greece. A member of the House of Savoy, Prince Aimone, 4th Duke of Aosta, was appointed king of the newly created Independent State of Croatia.

During the height of the Battle of Britain, the Italians launched an invasion of Egypt in the hope of capturing the Suez Canal. However, in December, the British launched Operation Compass and, by February 1941, the British had cut off and captured the Italian 10th Army and had driven deep into Libya. A German intervention prevented the fall of Libya and the combined Axis attacks drove the British back into Egypt until summer 1942, before being stopped at El Alamein. Allied intervention against Vichy French-held Morocco and Algeria created a two-front campaign. German and Italian forces entered Tunisia in late 1942 in response, however, forces in Egypt were soon forced to make a major retreat into Libya. By May 1943, Axis forces in Tunisia were forced to surrender.

The East African Campaign started with Italian advances into British-held Kenya, British Somaliland, and Sudan. In the summer of 1940, Italian armed forces successfully invaded all of British Somaliland. But, in the Spring of 1941, the British had counter-attacked and pushed deep into Italian East Africa. By 5 May, Haile Selassie I of Ethiopia had returned to Addis Ababa to reclaim his throne. In November, the last organised Italian resistance ended with the fall of Gondar. However, following the surrender of East Africa, some Italians conducted a guerrilla war which lasted for two more years.

In November 1942, when the Germans occupied Vichy France during Case Anton, Italian-occupied France was expanded with the occupation of Corsica.

End of the empire 

By the autumn of 1943, the Italian Empire and all dreams of an Imperial Italy effectively came to an end. On 7 May, the surrender of Axis forces in Tunisia and other near continuous Italian reversals, led King Victor Emmanuel III to plan the removal of Mussolini. Following the Invasion of Sicily, all support for Mussolini evaporated. A meeting of the Grand Council of Fascism was held on 24 July, which managed to impose a vote of no confidence to Mussolini. The "Duce" was subsequently deposed and arrested by the King on the following afternoon. Afterwards, Mussolini remained a prisoner of the King until 12 September, when, on the orders of Hitler, he was rescued by German paratroops and became leader of the newly established Italian Social Republic.

After 25 July, the new Italian government under the King and Field Marshal Pietro Badoglio remained outwardly part of the Axis. But, secretly, it started negotiations with the Allies. On the eve of the Allied landings at Salerno, which started the Allied invasion of Italy, the new Italian government secretly signed an armistice with the Allies. On 8 September, the armistice was made public. In Albania, Yugoslavia, the Dodecanese, and other territories still held by the Italians, German military forces successfully attacked their former Italian allies and ended Italy's rule. During the Dodecanese Campaign, an Allied attempt to take the Dodecanese with the cooperation of the Italian troops ended in total German victory. In China, the Imperial Japanese Army occupied Italy's concession in Tientsin after getting news of the armistice. Later in 1943 the Italian Social Republic formally ceded control of the concession to Japan's puppet regime in China, the Reorganized National Government of China under Wang Jingwei.

In 1947, the Treaty of Peace with Italy formally ended the empire that was now totally defunct. There were discussions to maintain Tripolitania (a province of Italian Libya) as the last Italian colony, but these were not successful. In November 1949 the former Italian Somaliland then under British military administration, was made a 10-year United Nations Trust Territory under Italian administration (Trust Territory of Somaliland). On 1 July 1960, Somalia merged with British Somaliland to form the independent Somali Republic.

Former colonies, protectorates and occupied areas
Italian Eritrea (1882–1947)
Italian Somalia (1889–1947)
Trust Territory of Somaliland (1950–1960)
Libya (1911–1947)
Italian Tripolitania and Cyrenaica (1911–1934)
Italian Libya (1934–1943)
Italian East Africa (1936–1941)
Italian Ethiopia (1936-1941)
Italian concessions in China
Italian concession of Tientsin (1901–1943)
Italian Albania (1917-1920, 1939-1943)
Italian Islands of the Aegean (1912–1947)
Italian occupation of France (1940–1943)
Independent State of Croatia (1941–1945)
Italian occupation of Montenegro (1941–1943)
Governorate of Dalmatia (1941–1943)
Hellenic State (1941–1943)
Province of Ljubljana (1941–1945)
Tunisia (1942-1943)

References

Citations

Bibliography

 Andall, Jacqueline and Derek Duncan, eds.  Italian Colonialism: Legacy and Memory (2005)
 Ben-Ghiat, Ruth and Mia Fuller, eds. Italian Colonialism (2005), 

 

 Finaldi, Giuseppe. A History of Italian Colonialism, 1860–1907: Europe’s Last Empire (Taylor & Francis, 2016).
 Hofmann, Reto. The Fascist Effect: Japan and Italy, 1915–1952 (Cornell UP, 2015) online</ref>

 Kelly, Saul. "Britain, the United States, and the end of the Italian empire in Africa, 1940–52." Journal of Imperial and Commonwealth History 28.3 (2000): 51–70.
  Kelly, Saul. Cold War in the Desert: Britain, the United States & the Italian Colonies, 1945-52 (2000).

 McGuire, Valerie. Italy's Sea: Empire and Nation in the Mediterranean, 1895-1945 (Liverpool University Press, 2020).
 Maurizio Marinelli, Giovanni Andornino, Italy's Encounter with Modern China: Imperial dreams, strategic ambitions, New York: Palgrave Macmillan, 2014.

 Palumbo, Patrizia. Place in the Sun: Africa in Italian Colonial Culture from Post-Unification to the Present (2003), since 1860.
 Pergher, Roberta. Mussolini's Nation-Empire: Sovereignty and Settlement in Italy's Borderlands, 1922–1943 (Cambridge UP, 2017)
 Poddar, Prem, and Lars Jensen, eds., A historical companion to postcolonial literatures: Continental Europe and Its Empires (Edinburgh UP, 2008), "Italy and its colonies" pp 262–313. excerpt
 Renzi, William A. "Italy's neutrality and entrance into the Great War: a re-examination." American Historical Review 73.5 (1968): 1414–1432.  online
 Shinn, Christopher A. "Inside the Italian Empire: Colonial Africa, Race Wars, and the ‘Southern Question’." in Shades of Whiteness (Brill, 2016) pp. 35-51.
 Srivastava, Neelam. Italian Colonialism and Resistances to Empire, 1930-1970 (Palgrave Macmillan, 2018).
 Steinmetz, George. "Ruth Ben-Ghiat’s Italian Fascism’s Empire Cinema." American Journal of Cultural Sociology 6.1 (2018): 212-222 online.
 Tripodi, Paolo. Colonial Legacy in Somalia: Rome & Mogadishu from Colonial Administration to Operation Restore Hope (1999) covers 19th century  to 1999. 
 Wright, Patricia. "Italy's African Dream: Part I, The Adowa Nightmare". History Today (Mar 1973), Vol. 23 Issue 3, pp 153–160, online; 
"Italy's African Dream. Part 2: Fatal Victory, 1935-6." History Today (April 1973), Vol. 23 Issue 4, pp 256–265. 
 "Italy's African Dream. Part 3: Nemesis in 1941," History Today (May 1973), Vol. 23 Issue 5, pp 336–34.

External links
  Atlas of Italian colonies, written by Baratta Mario and Visintin Luigi in 1928
 Simona Berhe: Colonies (Italy), in: 1914-1918-online. International Encyclopedia of the First World War.

 
1882 establishments in Italy
1960 disestablishments in Italy
States and territories established in 1882
States and territories disestablished in 1960
History of European colonialism
Empire
Overseas empires
Axis powers
Historical transcontinental empires